High School! Kimengumi has a large cast of characters. Because there are so many puns in Kimengumi, including the names of all of the characters, all of the character names appear in Japanese order (family name, given name) so that the jokes found in the names make sense. The voice actors names appear in the more common "given name, family name" order.

Kimengumi and friends

 
Kimengumi leader and protagonist of the series. Nickname: . His family runs a toy store, he lives with his father and younger sister (his mother has already died). Considered a "High Class Buffoon", he retains the same simple-mindedness he had as a child and is quite the hentai (as in "weirdo" rather than "pervert"). He is known for being able to do many odd things with his body. It took him three tries to pass the high school entry exam, but he finally manages to graduate to Ichiō High with his current class.
 
Kimengumi member #2. Nickname: . His family runs a sake store. He lives with his uncle's family. Despite being underage, he is occasionally drunk. He is a huge pro wrestling fan and can walk on water. He is a very hearty and violent fellow and does not always give Rei proper Leader treatment, but he is also kind hearted and does not allow others to make fun of his friends. It took him three tries to pass the high school entry exam.
 
Kimengumi member. Nickname: . His family runs a bathhouse. He is known around the school as a lecher, often peeking on the women's side of his parents' bathhouse. However, he is the brains of Kimengumi. His best friend is Jin. It took him three tries to pass the high school entry exam.
 
Kimengumi member. Nickname: . His family runs a cake shop (bakery and cake shop in anime). He loves to just eat and sleep and will often doze off during class. Although usually a very nice guy, his personality changes greatly when you mess with his food. He is very lucky and has excellent mimicry skills; particularly he is skilled at mimicking singer Yoshinori Monta. It took him two tries to pass the high school entry exam.
  (Kousuke Okano in 2000 PlayStation game)
Kimengumi member. Nickname: . His family runs a bookstore. He is an okama and is very feminine and will sometimes use this as a weapon. He is the weakest of the gang but is brave when he needs to be. He frequently cries and frequently undresses. It took him two tries to pass the high school entry exam.
 
The pink-haired classmate of the Kimengumi. She is very pretty and is popular with the male students. However, she isn't always aware of this. She is an oddball herself and has no interest in normal guys. She instead hangs out with Kimengumi and gradually falls in love with Rei. She often likes to become involved with games, but is not always aware when she loses. She graduates from Ōsei Junior High and goes on to Ichiō High. At the beginning of the series she is a more comical character, but by halfway through 3rd Year Kimengumi she has become the straight man of the group.
 
The green-haired classmate of Kimengumi and best friend of Yui. Her family runs a flower shop. Very strong-willed, she initially acts as the straight man to Yui and Kimengumi, but later becomes more comical. She hates it when people say that she has droopy eyes. In Junior High she had semi-long hair, but in High School she wears her hair in a ponytail. She and Yui hardly ever quarrel, and when they do it is usually a misunderstanding or accident. It is often hinted that she is very close to Gō, and at the end of the series they are depicted as living together in the Reietsu house (but whether or not her name is in the family registry is unknown).
 
Rei's dog, named after the dog in the famous TV series Lassie. Unlike other dogs, Lassie can walk on two legs like a human. He sometimes gets punished by Rei or his father and sister. Lassie has four dog friends, who try to help and support Lassie in various things or situations. He even has a crush on Yui's dog Beauty, whom he had won over after a battle with a dog who had previously been her lover.

Kimengumi families

Ichidō family
 
He and his late wife Naori were childhood friends. He was originally an honest and upright person, but was corrupted by Naori's father Seiretsu. He tends to favor Kiri over Rei, particularly in High School! Kimegumi. He was modeled after Cha Katō.
 
 Rei's little sister (8 years younger). Unlike Rei and Takuseki, she is rather normal and even strives to be an honor student. She is ashamed of her father and brother's behavior, and tries to hide her connection to them from her classmates. After Naori's death she takes care of all the housework. She first appears as an elementary school student, but halfway through the series she is suddenly depicted as a Junior High student. She is in love with Yui's little brother Ippei, and the two of them usually hang out together with Kiyoshi's little sister Kiyoi.
Ichidō Naori - No voice actor
Zenin Seiretsu - Takeshi Aono

Kawa family
Kawa Itazō - Kōji Totani
Kawa Riya - does not appear in anime
Kawa Ippei - Yūko Mita
Kawa Iko - Run Sasaki

Reietsu family
Reietsu Pūtarō - ???
Reietsu Gōgo - ???
Reietsu Torae - ???

Shusse family
Shusse Sendarō - Sanji Hase
Shusse Shichiyo - ???
Shusse Kiyoi - Tomiko Suzuki
Daima family
Daima Kyū - Rokuro Naya
Daima's Mother - Seiko Nakano
Daima Ō - does not appear in anime

Monohoshi family
Monohoshi Hyori - Yuri Nashiwa
Monohoshi Zao - Only appears in "Flash"

Uru family
Uru Saizō - Kazuyuki Sogabe
Uru Sae - Asami Mukaidono→Rihoko Yoshida
Beauty - Yuriko Yamamoto

Middle school gangs

Iro'otokogumi (class 3)

Leader
 
 Considered the most attractive man in the school. He specifically sets his eyes on Yui but because she dislikes pushy, overconfident guys he is rejected for the first time. As vain and as popular as he is though, he isn't all that smart and even failed his first attempt at the college entrance exam. He is also very bad at sports with the sole exception of skating, and it has been hinted that he has been practising at that his entire life.

Members
 
 Has a regent hairstyle and is in love with both Yui and Chie. He is very superficial and has a manly face.
 
 Has an afro hairstyle. Like Shō, he is in love with Yui. Even though they share a lot in common, he tends to play straight man to Shō.
 
 The only member of Iro'otokogumi with short hair. He also likes both Yui and Chie. Like Udegumi member Yutaka, he will occasionally talk to the readers.
 
 He has the same hairstyle as Rei but his facial features resemble Yui's (the author himself points this out at times).

Udegumi (class 9)

Leader
 
 A young man with good reflexes who holds numerous positions on more than one athletic club. The popularity of himself and Udegumi is second only to Iro'otokogumi. However, he is completely useless at anything non-athletic, and will often go in a corner and begin training during class. He is in fit shape from training all day, be it in class, at home, or anywhere else he goes. He has a father named  and an older twin sister named Mei (see Girls' Volleyball Club).

Members
Akiresu Ken - Hiroshi Izawa
Intahai Susumu - Hōchū Ohtsuka
Konjō Yutaka - Kōzō Shioya
Suji Chikara - Ryō Horikawa

Bangumi (class 4)

Leader
 
 A cool customer who is largely considered to be the boss of Ichiō High, although he denies this. He does not wear his uniform, arrives late, leaves early, and smokes regularly. Despite what his many school violations may imply, he actually dislikes causing trouble. His eyes are usually hidden behind his forelock and he has twice failed the college entrance exams.

Members
Tabuchi Koeru - Kōzō Shioya
Nakasudō Omiya - Kōji Totani
Meri Kensaku - Ryō Horikawa
Jōgai Ranto - Masaharu Satō

Honegumi (class 1)

Leader
 
 He has a long face and a noticeable upper lip. He and his study group care about nothing other than studying. He is instantly smitten by Yui, but is nonetheless antagonistic towards her. He later graduates and goes onto , but because Shinzawa loved drawing his face so much, his little brother  enrolls in Ichiō High with the Kimengumi.

Members
Arakata Ukaru - ???
Munaita Dan - Tomohiro Nishimura
Waseda Keio - Junichi Kanemaru
Kurutsu Teru - Tomohiro Nishimura

Omegumi (class 7)

Leader
 
 A very popular character, she lives up to her name and has the tough personality of a gang member. She loves disco music and she has always smoked, even before she started elementary school. She and her members frequently leave class early and she often hands in blank test papers, but after meeting Ikari-sensei she becomes more of a model student (in fact, after graduating high school she studies abroad in the United States). She has a very sweet face and is often seen with Nihiruda Yō, but whether or not they are involved is unknown. She later harbours feelings for Jidai-sensei. She fails her first entrance exam.

Members
Hidari Maki: Hiroko Emori
Sandanbara Ikue: Noriko Uemura
Honba Desuko: Mami Matsui
Ohba Kayo: Mari Yokō

Rukkumi (class 6)
Sawaki Makurō: Issei Futamata

Fukumi (class 2)
Koyakushimaru Hiro: Arisa Andō
Matsumo Toiyo: Chie Satou

Other middle school characters
Shinjitsu Ichirō: Bin Shimada

High school classmates
Nikaidō Men'ichi: Hiroshi Takemura
Monozuki Shumi: Matsumi Ōshiro
Oda Mari: Kazumi Amemiya

High school gangs

Koekumi
Zenini Jūgo: Masashi Hironaka

Nikumi
Jaki'ichi En: Toshio Furukawa
Shō Rinji: Hideyuki Hori
Ryūno Ninjiya: Sho Hayami

Shikumi
Kanmu Ryō: Hiroshi Ōtake
Otokowa Dokyō: Kazuo Oka
Kai Danji: Yukitoshi Hori

Club members
Baseball club
Kanzenji Ai: Hōchū Ōtsuka

Drama club
Taiga Dorama: Hideyuki Tanaka
Kusaishi Nario: Kazuhiko Inoue

Girls' volleyball club
Undō Mei: Eiko Hisamura
Boxing club
Ichimōda Jin: Kazuhiko Inoue
Ashita Nojio: Ryūsei Nakao

Soccer club
Nanakorobi Yaoki: Kōichi Hashimoto

Table tennis club
Taku Kyūma: Shin'ya Ōtaki

Rival school club members

Oronainnan High girls' volleyball club
Satsujin Supaiko: Tomie Kataoka

Irebun High soccer club
Tamasabaki Takumi: Toshio Furukawa
Soreike Minna: Masato Hirano

Otokono High judo club
Rokujō Hitoma: Banjō Ginga
Tenka Taihei: Jun Hazumi
Other high school characters
Nancy Toruneaata: Saeko Shimazu
Watashidake Katsutoshi: Katsuji Mori
Harumage Don: Tōru Furuya
Otonari Hisako: Chika Sakamoto
Andō Roido: Yūji Mitsuya
Oyashiki Machi: Masako Miura
Yaseino Elza: Keiko Toda

Teachers

Homeroom teacher of Kimengumi during their Middle School days (Homeroom teacher for Kojougumi during High School). She is a beautiful speech teacher with a hysterical personality. She actually used to go to school with Kimengumi as their senpai. She later marries Sessa-sensei and has a son named . In the anime she will often say  when angered. Voiced by Masako Katsuki.

Homeroom teacher for Udegumi. A manly gym teacher with a simple personality. He does not get along well with Iro'oto-sensei, who is his love rival for Ikari-sensei. After marrying Ikari he is transferred to another school. Voiced by Yoshito Yasuhara.
Irooto Kō: Hiroshi Izawa 
Sainan Auzō: Takurō Kitagawa
Kaibu Tsuya: Kazuyo Aoki
Kochō Sakio: Kenichi Ogata
Toyotoshi Mansaku: Naoki Tatsuta
Kataiwa Tetsuko: Rihoko Yoshida
 : Yumiko Shibata
Aozora Haruo: Kōji Totani
Jidai Sakugo: Hideyuki Tanaka
Mutsu Gorō: Ikuya Sawaki, Kōichi Kitamura

Other characters
Himawari: Masaharu Satō
Tulip: Kōji Totani
Kashikiri Yasuka: Rika Fukami
Hirayama Yukio: Kenji Utsumi
Hitohi Kazuyoshi: Yūji Mitsuya

See also
High School! Kimengumi
List of High School! Kimengumi episodes

References

Characters
High School Kimengumi